Tasmania is located south of the mainland of Australia, separated from the state of Victoria by the 240 km wide Bass Strait. Although Tasmania shares most of its fauna with the southern parts of Australia or Australia as a whole, Tasmania's isolation along with its wetter, cooler and cloudier weather caused the evolution of several endemic Tasmanian species and subspecies, butterflies included.

There are thirty-nine species of butterflies found in Tasmania. They are grouped primarily as: skippers, blues, browns, swallowtails and the introduced whites.

Papilionidae 

family: Papilionidae (swallowtails) — 1 species

Papilioninae 
 genus: Graphium
 Macleay's swallowtail, Graphium macleayanus (moggana)

Pieridae 

family: Pieridae (whites and yellows) — 4 species

Coliadinae 
 genus: Eurema
 Small grass yellow, Eurema smilax

Pierinae 
 genus: Appias
 Albatross butterfly, Appias paulina
 genus: Anaphaeis
 Caper white, Anaphaeis java
 genus: Pieris
 Small white, Pieris rapae

Lycaenidae 
family: Lycaenidae (gossamer-winged blues and coppers) — 9 species

Polyommatinae 
 genus: Candalides
 Blotched blue, Candalides acasta
 genus: Lampides
 Pea blue, Lampides boeticus
 genus: Neolucia
 Fringed blue, Neolucia agricola
 Mountain blue, Neolucia hobartensis
 Mathew's blue, Neolucia mathewi
 genus: Theclinesthes
 Chequered blue, Theclinesthes serpentata
 genus: Zizina
 Common grass blue, Zizina labradus

Theclinae
 genus: Paralucia
 Bright copper, Paralucia aurifer
 genus: Pseudalmenus
 Tasmanian hairstreak, Pseudalmenus chlorinda (chlorinda)

Nymphalidae
family: Nymphalidae (brush– or four-footed) — 14 species

Danainae
 genus: Danaus
 Lesser wanderer butterfly, Danaus chrysippus
 Wanderer butterfly, Danaus plexippus

Nymphalinae
 genus: Junonia
 Meadow argus, Junonia villida
 genus: Vanessa
 Yellow admiral, Vanessa itea
 Australian painted lady, Vanessa kershawi

Satyrinae

 genus: Argynnina
 Tasmanian brown, Argynnina hobartia
 genus: Geitoneura
 Klug's xenica, Geitoneura klugii
 genus: Heteronympha
 Bright-eyed brown, Heteronympha cordace
 Common brown, Heteronympha merope
 Shouldered brown, Heteronympha penelope
 genus: Nesoxenica
 Leprea brown, Nesoxenica leprea
 genus: Oreixenica
 Common silver xenica, Oreixenica lathoniella
 Orichora brown, Oreixenica orichora
 Ptunarra brown, Oreixenica ptunarra

Hesperiidae
family: Hesperiidae (skippers) — 11 species

 genus: Anisynta
 Dominula skipper Anisynta dominula
 genus: Antipodia
 Antipodia skipper Antipodia chaostola
 genus: Hesperilla
 Chrysotricha skipper Hesperilla chrysotricha
 Donnysa skipper Hesperilla donnysa
 Flame skipper Hesperilla idothea
 Master's skipper Hesperilla mastersi
 genus: Ocybadistes
 Yellow-banded dart Ocybadistes walkeri
 genus: Oreisplanus
 Marrawah skipper or alpine skipper Oreisplanus munionga
 genus: Pasma
 Tasmanica skipper or two-spotted grass-skipper Pasma tasmanicus
 genus: Taractrocera
 White grassdart Taractrocera papyria
 genus: Trapezites
 Rare white-spot skipper Trapezites lutea

See also
List of butterflies of Australia
List of butterflies of Victoria

References
Lepidoptera of Tasmania
Leatherwood Online - Article on Tasmanian Butterflies

Butterflies
Tasmania
Butterflies
Tasmania
Tasmania
Butterflies of Tasmania